Westminster Abbey, formally titled the Collegiate Church of Saint Peter at Westminster, is an Anglican church in the City of Westminster, London, England. Since 1066, it has been the location of the coronations of 39 English and British monarchs, and a burial site for 18 English, Scottish and British monarchs. At least 16 royal weddings have occurred at the abbey since 1100.

Although the origins of the church are obscure, there was certainly an abbey operating on the site by the mid-10th century, housing Benedictine monks. The church got its first grand building in the 1060s under the auspices of the English king Edward the Confessor, who is still buried inside. Construction of the present church began in 1245 on the orders of Henry III. The monastery was dissolved in 1559 and the church was made a royal peculiar—a Church of England church responsible directly to the sovereign—by Elizabeth I. In 1987, the abbey, together with the Palace of Westminster and St. Margaret's Church, was designated a UNESCO World Heritage site because of its outstanding universal value.

The Gothic architecture of the church is chiefly inspired by French and English styles from the 13th century, although some sections of the church show earlier Romanesque styles or later Baroque and modern styles. The Henry VII chapel at the east end of the church is a typical example of Perpendicular Gothic architecture, and was called by John Leland the orbis miraculum (the wonder of the world).

The abbey is the burial site of more than 3,300 people, many of prominence in British history: monarchs, prime ministers, poets laureate, actors, scientists, military leaders, and the Unknown Warrior. The fame of the figures buried there has led to the abbey being called a "National Valhalla".

History
Although historians agree that there was a monastery dedicated to St. Peter on the site prior to the 11th century, its exact origin is somewhat obscure. One legend claims that it was founded by the Saxon king Sebert, and another that its founder was the fictional 2nd-century British king Lucius. One tradition claims that a young fisherman on the River Thames had a vision of Saint Peter near the site. This seems to have been quoted as the origin of the salmon that Thames fishermen offered to the abbey, a custom still observed annually by the Fishmongers' Company. The recorded origins of the abbey date to the 960s or early 970s, when Saint Dunstan and King Edgar installed a community of Benedictine monks on the site. At that time, the location was an island in the middle of the River Thames called Thorn Ey. The buildings from this time would have been wooden, and have not survived.

11th century: Edward the Confessor's abbey
Between 1042 and 1052, Edward the Confessor began rebuilding St. Peter's Abbey to provide himself with a royal burial church. It was built in the Romanesque style and was the first church in England built on a cruciform floorplan. The master stonemason for the project was Leofsi Duddason, with Godwin and Wendelburh Gretsyd (meaning "fat purse") as patrons, and Teinfrith as "churchwright", probably meaning someone who worked on the carpentry and roof. Increased endowments supported a community that increased from a dozen monks during Dunstan's time, up to as many as eighty monks. The building was completed around 1060 and was consecrated on 28 December 1065, only a week before Edward's death on 5 January 1066. A week later, he was buried in the church; nine years later, his wife Edith was buried alongside him. His successor, Harold Godwinson, was probably crowned here, although the first documented coronation is that of William the Conqueror later that year.

The only extant depiction of Edward's abbey is in the Bayeux Tapestry. The foundations still survive under the present church, and above ground, some of the lower parts of the monastic dormitory survive in the undercroft, including a door said to come from the previous Saxon abbey. It was a little smaller than the current church, with a central tower.

In 1103, thirty-seven years after his death, Edward's tomb was re-opened by Abbot Gilbert Crispin and Henry I, who discovered that his body was still in perfect condition. This was considered proof of his saintliness, and he was canonised in 1161. Two years later he was moved to a new shrine, during which time his ring was removed and placed in the Abbey's collection.

13th-14th centuries: Construction of the present church
The abbot and monks, being adjacent to the Palace of Westminster (the seat of government from the late 13th century), became a powerful force in the centuries after the Norman Conquest, with the Abbot of Westminster taking a seat in the House of Lords. The abbot remained Lord of the manor of Westminster as a town of two to three thousand people grew around the abbey: as a consumer and employer on a grand scale, the abbey helped fuel the town's economy, and relations with the town remained unusually cordial, but no enfranchising charter was issued during the Middle Ages.

Westminster Abbey became the coronation site of Norman kings, but none were buried there until Henry III began to rebuild it in the Gothic style as a shrine to venerate King Edward the Confessor, as a competitor to match the great French churches such as Rheims Cathedral and Sainte-Chapelle, and as a burial place for himself and his family. Edward's shrine subsequently played a great part in his canonisation. Construction began on 6 July 1245 under Henry's master mason, Henry of Reynes. The first building stage included the entire eastern end, the transepts, and the easternmost bay of the nave. The Lady Chapel, built from around 1220 at the extreme eastern end, was incorporated into the chevet of the new building, but has since been replaced by the Henry VII Chapel. Around 1253, Henry of Reynes was replaced by John of Gloucester, who was replaced by Robert of Beverley around 1260. During the summer, there were up to 400 workers on the site at a time, including stonecutters, marblers, stone-layers, carpenters, painters and their assistants, marble polishers, smiths, glaziers, plumbers, and general labourers. From 1257, Henry III held assemblies of local representatives in Westminster Abbey's chapter house, which were a precursor to the House of Commons. Henry III also commissioned the Cosmati pavement in front of the High Altar. Further building work carried the nave on an additional five bays, bringing it to one bay west of the choir. Here, construction stopped in about 1269. By 1261 alone Henry had spent £29,345 19s 8d on the abbey, and the final sum may have been in the region of £50,000. A consecration ceremony was held on 13 October 1269, during which the remains of Edward the Confessor were moved to their present location at the shrine behind the main altar, but after Henry's death and burial in the abbey in 1272, construction did not resume and Edward the Confessor's old Romanesque nave remained attached to the new building for over a century.

In 1296, Edward I captured the Scottish coronation artefact, the Stone of Scone, and had a Coronation Chair made to hold it, which he entrusted to the abbot at Westminster Abbey. In 1303, the small crypt underneath the chapter house was broken into and a great deal of the king's treasure stolen. It was thought that the thieves must have been helped by the abbey monks, fifty of whom were subsequently imprisoned in the Tower of London.

From 1376, Abbot Nicholas Litlyngton and Richard II donated large sums to finish the church, and the remainder of the old nave was pulled down and rebuilding recommenced, with his mason, Henry Yevele, closely following the original (and by then outdated) design. During the Peasants' Revolt of 1381, Richard prayed at Edward the Confessor's shrine for "divine aid when human counsel was altogether wanting" before meeting the rebels at Smithfield. To this day, the abbey holds his full-length portrait, the earliest of an English king, on display near the west door. However, building work was not to be fully completed for many years. Henry V, disappointed with the abbey's unfinished state, gave extra funds towards the rebuilding, and in his will left instructions for a chantry chapel to be built over his tomb, which can still be viewed from ground level today. Building work finally reached the end of the nave, finishing with the west window, in 1495.

Under Henry VII, the 13th-century Lady Chapel was demolished and rebuilt in a Perpendicular style, dedicated to the Blessed Virgin Mary in 1503 (known as the "Henry VII Chapel" or the "Lady Chapel"). The chapel was finished c.1519. Henry's original reason for building such a grand chapel was to have a place suitable for the burial of another saint alongside the Confessor, as he planned on having Henry VI canonised. The Pope asked Henry VII for a large sum of money to achieve sainthood for his predecessor, which he was not willing to hand over, and so instead Henry VII is buried in the centre of the chapel with his wife, Elizabeth of York.

A view of the abbey dated 1532 shows a lantern tower above the crossing, but it is not shown in any later depiction. It is unlikely that the loss of this feature was caused by any catastrophic event, but structural failure seems more likely. However, other sources maintain that a lantern tower was never built. The current squat pyramid dates from the 18th century and the painted wooden ceiling below it was installed during repairs to wartime bomb damage.
 
In the early 16th century, a project began under Abbot John Islip to add two towers to the western end of the church. These were partially built up to the roof level of the church when building work stopped because of the uncertainty caused by the English Reformation.

16th-17th centuries: Dissolution and Reformation
In the 1530s, Henry VIII broke away from the authority of the Catholic Church in Rome and seized control of England's monasteries, including Westminster Abbey, beginning the English Reformation and seizing control of monasteries across the country. In 1535, when the king's officers assessed the abbey's funds, their annual income was £3,000. Henry's agents removed many relics, saints' images, and treasures from the abbey: the golden feretory that housed the coffin of Edward the Confessor was melted down, and the monks even hid his bones to save them from destruction. Henry VIII assumed direct control of the abbey in 1539 and granted it the status of a cathedral by charter in 1540, simultaneously issuing letters patent establishing the Diocese of Westminster. By granting the abbey cathedral status, Henry VIII gained an excuse to spare it from the destruction or dissolution which he inflicted on most English abbeys during this period. The abbot, William Benson, instead became dean of the cathedral, while the prior and five of the monks were among the twelve newly created canons.

The Westminster diocese was dissolved in 1550, but the abbey was recognised (in 1552, retroactively to 1550) as a second cathedral of the Diocese of London until 1556. The already-old expression "robbing Peter to pay Paul" may have been given a new lease of life when money meant for the abbey, which is dedicated to Saint Peter, was diverted to the treasury of St. Paul's Cathedral.

The abbey saw the return of Benedictine monks under the Catholic Mary I, but they were again ejected under Elizabeth I in 1559. In 1560, Elizabeth re-established Westminster as a "royal peculiar" – a church of the Church of England responsible directly to the sovereign, rather than to a diocesan bishop – and made it the Collegiate Church of St. Peter (that is, a non-cathedral church with an attached chapter of canons, headed by a dean). From this date onwards, although the building is still called an abbey, it is, strictly speaking, simply a church. Elizabeth also re-founded Westminster School, providing for 40 students known as the King's (or Queen's) Scholars and their schoolmasters. The King's Scholars have the duty of shouting Vivat Rex or Vivat Regina ("Long live the King/ Queen") during the coronation of a new monarch.To this day, the Dean of Westminster Abbey remains the chair of the school governors.

In the early 17th century, the abbey hosted two of the six companies of churchmen, led by Lancelot Andrewes, Dean of Westminster, who translated the King James Version of the Bible.

In 1642, the English Civil War broke out between Charles I and his own Parliament. The Dean and Chapter fled the abbey at the outbreak of war, and were replaced by priests loyal to Parliament. The abbey itself suffered damage during the war, when altars, stained glass, the organ and the crown jewels were damaged or destroyed. Lord Protector Oliver Cromwell was given an elaborate funeral there in 1658, only for a body thought to be Cromwell's to be disinterred in January 1661 and posthumously hanged from a gibbet at Tyburn. In 1669, the abbey was visited by the diarist Samuel Pepys, who saw the body of the 15th-century queen Catherine de Valois. She had been buried in the 13th-century Lady Chapel in 1437, but was exhumed during building work for the Henry VII Chapel and not reburied in the intervening 150 years. Pepys leaned into the coffin and kissed her on the mouth, writing "This was my birthday, thirty-six years old and I did first kiss a queen." She has since been re-interred close to her husband, Henry V. In 1685, during preparations for the coronation of James II, a workman accidentally put a scaffolding pole through the coffin of Edward the Confessor. A chorister, Charles Taylour, pulled a cross on a chain out of the coffin and gave it to the king, who then gave it to the Pope. Its whereabouts today are unknown.

18th-19th centuries: Western towers constructed

At the end of the 17th century, the architect Sir Christopher Wren was appointed the abbey's first Surveyor of the Fabric, and began a project to restore the exterior of the church, which was continued by his successor, William Dickinson. After over two hundred years, the abbey's two western towers were finally built between 1722 and 1745 by Nicholas Hawksmoor and John James, constructed from Portland stone to an early example of a Gothic Revival design. Purbeck marble was used for the walls and the floors, although the various tombstones are made of different types of marble.

During an earthquake in 1750, the top of one of the piers on the north side fell down, with the iron and lead that had fastened it. Several houses fell in, and many chimneys were damaged. Another shock had been felt during the preceding month.

On 11 November 1760, the funeral of George II was held at the abbey and the king was interred next to his late wife, Caroline of Ansbach. He left instructions for the sides of his and his wife's coffins to be removed so that their remains could mingle. He was the last monarch to be buried in the abbey. Similarly, during this period the tomb of Richard II had developed a hole through which visitors could put their hand. Several of his bones went missing, including a jawbone, which was taken by a boy from Westminster School and kept in the family until 1906, when it was returned to the abbey.

In the 1830s, the previous screen dividing the nave from the choir, which had been designed by Nicholas Hawksmoor, was replaced by one designed by Edward Blore. The screen contains the monuments for the scientist Isaac Newton and the military general James Stanhope.

Further rebuilding and restoration occurred in the 19th century under the architect George Gilbert Scott, who rebuilt the facade of the north transept, changing the rose window and porches on that side, and designed a new altar and reredos for the crossing. A narthex (a portico or entrance hall) for the west front was designed by Sir Edwin Lutyens in the mid-20th century but was not built.

20th century

The abbey saw "Prayers For Prisoners" suffragette protests in 1913 and 1914. Protesters attended services and interrupted proceedings by chanting "God Save Mrs. Pankhurst" and praying for suffragette prisoners. In one protest, a woman chained herself to her chair during a sermon by the Archbishop of Canterbury. On 11 June 1914, a bomb planted by suffragettes of the Women's Social and Political Union exploded inside the abbey. The abbey was busy with visitors, with around 80–100 people in the building at the time of the explosion. The bomb blew off a corner of the Coronation Chair. It also caused the Stone of Scone to break in half, although this was not discovered until 1950, when four Scottish nationalists broke into the church to steal the stone and return it to Scotland. The bomb had been packed with nuts and bolts to act as shrapnel. The event was part of a campaign of bombing and arson attacks carried out by suffragettes nationwide between 1912 and 1914. Churches were a particular target, as it was believed that the Church of England was complicit in reinforcing opposition to women's suffrage – 32 churches were attacked nationwide between 1913 and 1914. Many in the Commons heard the explosion and rushed to the scene. Two days after the Westminster Abbey bombing, a second suffragette bomb was discovered before it could explode in St. Paul's Cathedral.

Westminster suffered minor damage during the Blitz on 15 November 1940. On 10/11 May 1941, the Westminster Abbey precincts and roof were hit by incendiary bombs. Although the Auxiliary Fire Service and the abbey's own fire-watchers were able to stop the fire spreading to the whole of the church, the deanery and three residences of abbey clergy and staff were badly damaged, and the lantern tower above the crossing collapsed, leaving the abbey open to the sky. The cost of the damage was estimated at £135,000. Some damage can still be seen in the RAF Chapel, where a small hole in the wall was created by a bomb that fell outside the chapel.

Because of its outstanding universal value, the abbey was designated a UNESCO World Heritage Site in 1987, together with the nearby Palace of Westminster and St. Margaret's Church.

In 1997, the abbey, which was then receiving approximately 1.75 million visitors each year, began charging admission fees to visitors at the door (although a fee for entering the eastern half of the church had existed prior to 1600).

21st century 
In June 2009 the first major building work in 250 years was proposed. A corona – a crown-like architectural feature – was suggested to be built around the lantern over the central crossing, replacing an existing pyramidal structure dating from the 1950s. This was part of a wider £23m development of the abbey completed in 2013. On 4 August 2010, the Dean and Chapter announced that, "[a]fter a considerable amount of preliminary and exploratory work", efforts toward the construction of a corona would not be continued.

The Cosmati pavement was re-dedicated by the Dean at a service on 21 May 2010 after undergoing a major cleaning and conservation programme. On 17 September 2010, Pope Benedict XVI became the first pope to set foot in the abbey, and on 29 April 2011, the wedding of Prince William and Catherine Middleton took place at the abbey.

In 2018, the Queen's Diamond Jubilee Galleries were created in the medieval triforium. This is a display area for the abbey's treasures in the galleries high up around the sanctuary. A new Gothic access tower with lift was designed by the abbey architect and Surveyor of the Fabric, Ptolemy Dean.

In 2020, a 13th-century sacristy was uncovered in the grounds of the abbey as part of an archaeological excavation. The sacristy was used by the monks of the abbey to store objects used in the Mass, such as vestments and chalices. Also on the site were hundreds of burials, mostly of abbey monks.

On 10 March 2021, a vaccination centre opened in Poets' Corner to administer doses of COVID-19 vaccines.

Architecture 

The building is chiefly Reigate stone, and is mostly built in a Geometric Gothic style. The church has an eleven-bay nave with aisles, transepts, and a chancel with ambulatory and radiating chapels. The height of the building is supported with two tiers of flying buttresses. The western end of the nave and the west front were designed by Henry Yevele in a Perpendicular Gothic style. The Henry VII Chapel was built in a late Perpendicular style, probably by Robert and William Vertue. The west towers were designed by Nicholas Hawksmoor and blend Gothic with Baroque style.

The present Westminster Abbey is largely based on French Gothic styles, especially those found at Rheims Cathedral, rather than the contemporaneous English Gothic styles. For example, the English Gothic style favours large and elaborate towers, while Westminster Abbey did not have any towers at all until the 18th century. It is also more similar to French churches than English ones in terms of its ratio of height to width: Westminster Abbey has the highest nave of any Gothic church in England, and the nave is much narrower than any medieval English church of a similar height. Instead of a short, square, eastern end, as was the English fashion, Westminster Abbey has a long, rounded apse, and it also has chapels radiating from the ambulatory, which is typical of a French Gothic style. However, there are also distinctively English elements, such as the use of materials of contrasting colours, like Purbeck marble and white stone in the crossing.

The northern door features an elaborately-carved tympanum, leading it to acquire the nickname "Solomon's porch" as a reference to the legendary temple in Jerusalem.

The abbey still retains its 13th- and 14th-century cloisters, which would have been one of the busiest parts of the church when it was a monastery. The west cloister was used for the teaching of novice monks; the north for private study. The south cloister led to the refectory, and the east to the chapter house and dormitory. In the south-west corner of the cloisters is a cellarium used by the monks to store food and wine, which is today the abbey cafe. The abbey also contains a smaller Little Cloister, on the site of the monks' infirmary. The Little Cloister dates from the end of the 17th century and contains a small garden with a fountain in the centre. A passageway from the Little Cloister leads to College Garden, which has been in continuous use for 900 years, beginning as the medicine garden for the monks of the abbey and now overlooked by canon's houses and the dormitory for Westminster School.

The newest part of the abbey is the Weston Tower, finished in 2018 and designed by Ptolemy Dean. It sits between the chapter house and the Henry VII Chapel, and contains a lift shaft and spiral staircase to allow public access to the triforium, which contains the Queen's Diamond Jubilee Galleries. The tower has a star-shaped floorplan and leaded windows with an elaborate crown rooftop. The lift shaft inside is faced with 16 kinds of stone from the abbey's history, including Purbeck marble, Reigate stone, and Portland stone. The project took five years and cost £22.9m. The galleries themselves were designed by McInnes Usher McKnight.

Interior 
Inside, the church has Purbeck marble piers and shafting. In order to fit in as many guests as possible during coronations,the transepts were designed to be unusually long and the choir placed to the east of the crossing rather than to the west- a feature also seen in Rheims Cathedral.

The nave was built slowly over the course of many centuries from the east end to the west end, and yet, because generations of builders stuck to the original design, it has a very unified style. The only marker to show the long gap in building work between 1269 and 1376 is on the spandrels above the arches, which towards the earlier east end are decorated with diaper-work, and towards the west end, built later, are plain. Above the crossing, in the centre of the church, is a roof lantern, destroyed by a bomb in 1941 and restored by the architect Stephen Dykes Bower in 1958. In the choir aisles, shields of donors to the 13th- and 14th-century rebuilding are carved and painted in the spandrels of the arcade. At the eastern end of the nave is a large screen separating the nave from the choir, made of 13th-century stone but totally reworked by the architect Edward Blore in 1834 and with paintwork and gilding by Bower in the 1960s.

Behind the main altar, in the holiest part of the church, lies the shrine and tomb of Edward the Confessor. Saints' shrines were once common in English medieval churches, but most were destroyed during the English Reformation, and Edward is the only major English saint whose body still occupies his shrine. Arranged around him in a horseshoe shape are a series of tombs of medieval kings and their queens: Henry III, Eleanor of Castile, Edward I, Philippa of Hainault, Edward III, Anne of Bohemia, Richard II, and finally, Henry V in the centre of the horseshoe, at the eastern end. Henry III's tomb was originally covered in gold mosaic and coloured stone, but these have since been picked off by generations of tourists below the level of hand height. Above Henry V's tomb, at a mezzanine level hanging over the ambulatory, is a chantry chapel built by the mason John Thirske, decorated with many sculpted figures, including Henry V riding a horse, and being crowned in the abbey itself. At the western end, the shrine is totally separated from the main church by a stone reredos, closing off the shrine as a semi-private space. The screen depicts episodes from the saint's life, including his birth and the building of the abbey. The shrine is closed to the public except for special events.

The abbey includes side chapels radiating from the ambulatory. Many were originally included in the 13th-century rebuilding as special altars dedicated to individual saints, and many of the chapels still bear saints' names, e.g. St. Nicholas, St. Paul, etc. From the time of the English Reformation, saints' cults were no longer orthodox, and so instead the chapels were repurposed as places for extra burials and monuments. In the north ambulatory are the Islip Chapel, the Nurses' Memorial Chapel (sometimes called the "Nightingale Chapel"), the Chapel of Our Lady of the Pew, the Chapel of St. John the Baptist, and St. Paul's Chapel. The Islip Chapel is named after Abbot John Islip, who commissioned it in the 16th century. The screen inside is decorated with a visual pun on his name, showing an eye and a boy falling from a tree (eye-slip). There are further chapels within the eastern aisle of the north transept, named after (from south to north) St. John the Evangelist, St. Michael, and St. Andrew. In the south ambulatory are the chapels of St. Nicholas, St. Edmund, and St. Benedict.

The footprint of the south transept is by necessity a little smaller than the northern one, because the 13th-century builders butted up against the pre-existing 11th-century cloisters. Instead, to make the transepts match, the south transept is built hanging over the western cloister. This allowed the creation of a room above the cloisters used to store the abbey muniments. In the south transept is the chapel of St. Faith, built c.1250 to serve as the vestry for the abbey monks. On the east wall is a painting of her, made c.1290–1310, showing her holding the grid-iron she was roasted to death on.

Chapter house and Pyx Chamber 
The chapter house was used by the abbey monks for daily meetings where they would hear a chapter of the Rule of St. Benedict and be given their instructions for the day from the abbot. It was also used by the King's Great Council and the House of Commons as a meeting chamber during the 14th century. For 300 years after the English Reformation, it was used to store state records, until these were moved to the Public Record Office in 1863. It was restored by George Gilbert Scott in 1872. The entrance is approached from the east cloister and includes a double doorway with a large tympanum above. Inner and outer vestibules lead to the octagonal chapter house. It is built in a Geometrical Gothic style with an octagonal crypt below and a pier of eight shafts carrying the vaulted ceiling. Around the sides are blind arcading and numerous stone benches, above which are large, four-light, quatre-foiled windows. The exterior includes flying buttresses added in the 14th century and a leaded tent-lantern roof on an iron frame designed by Scott.

The walls of the chapter house are decorated with 14th- and 15th-century paintings representing the Apocalypse, the Last Judgement, and birds and animals. The depiction of the Apocalypse is the only example in England. The chapter house also has an original mid-13th-century tiled floor. A wooden door within the vestibule was made with a tree felled 1032-1064 and is one of the oldest in Britain. It may have been the door to the 11th-century chapter house in Edward the Confessor's abbey, and was re-used as the door to the Pyx Chamber in the 13th century. Today it leads to an office.

The adjoining Pyx Chamber formed the undercroft of the monks' dormitory. It dates to the late 11th century and was used as a monastic and royal treasury. The outer walls and circular piers date from the 11th-century; several of the capitals were enriched in the 12th century, and the stone altar added in the 13th century. The term pyx refers to the boxwood chest in which coins were held and presented to a jury during the Trial of the Pyx, in which newly minted coins were presented to ensure they conformed to the required standards.

The chapter house and Pyx Chamber at Westminster Abbey are in the guardianship of English Heritage, but under the care and management of the Dean and Chapter of Westminster.

Henry VII Chapel 

The Henry VII Lady Chapel, also known simply as the Henry VII Chapel, is a large Lady chapel at the far eastern end of Westminster Abbey, paid for by the will of King Henry VII. The chapel is built in a very late Perpendicular Gothic style, the magnificence of which caused the English poet John Leland to call it the orbis miraculum (the wonder of the world). The tombs of several monarchs, including Edward V, Henry VII, Edward VI, Mary I, Elizabeth I, James I, Charles II, George II and Mary, Queen of Scots, are found in the chapel.

The chapel is noted for its pendant and fan vault ceiling, probably designed by William Vertue, which the writer Washington Irving said was "achieved with the wonderful minuteness and airy security of a cobweb". The interior walls are densely decorated with carvings, including 95 statues of saints. Many statues of saints in England were destroyed in the 17th century, so these are a rare survival. From the outside, the chapel is surrounded by flying buttresses, each taking the form of a polygonal tower topped with a cupola. At the centre of the chapel is the tomb of Henry VII and his wife, Elizabeth of York, made by the sculptor Pietro Torregiano, who fled to England from Italy after getting into a fight with the artist Michaelangelo and breaking his nose.

The chapel has within it further sub-chapels radiating from the main structure. One of these to the north contains the tombs of Mary I and Elizabeth I, both coffins being within Elizabeth's monument; and another to the south contains the tomb of Mary, Queen of Scots. Both monuments were commissioned by James I, the successor of Elizabeth to the English throne and the son of Mary, Queen of Scots. At the far eastern end is the RAF Chapel, with a stained-glass window dedicated to those who died in the Battle of Britain in 1940.

The chapel has also been the mother church of the Order of the Bath since 1725, and the banners of members hang above the stalls. The stalls themselves retain their medieval misericords – small ledges for monks to perch on during services, often decorated with varied and humorous carvings.

Monastic buildings 

Many of the rooms used by the monks still exist, only repurposed. The dormitory was turned into a library and a school room, and their offices have been converted into houses for the clergy. The abbot had his own lodgings and ate separately from the rest of the monks. The abbot's lodgings still exist, but are instead used by the dean of the church, and are probably the oldest continuously occupied residence in London. They include the Jericho Parlour, built c.1520 and covered in wooden linenfold panelling, and the Jerusalem Chamber, which was the abbot's drawing room. The windows in the Jerusalem Chamber are stained glass and may have come from the original Lady Chapel which existed prior to the building of the Henry VII Chapel. The abbot also had a grand dining hall complete with minstrels' gallery, now used by Westminster School. The prior also had his own household separate from the monks, the remains of which form the core of Ashburnham House in Little Dean's Yard, now also part of Westminster School.

Artworks and treasures 
In the nave and transepts are sixteen crystal chandeliers made of handblown Waterford glass. They were designed by A. B. Read and Stephen Dykes Bower, and donated by the Guinness family in 1965 to commemorate the abbey's 900th anniversary. The choir stalls were designed by Edward Blore in 1848. Some stalls are assigned to high commissioners of countries in the Commonwealth of Nations.

Beyond the crossing to the west is the sacrarium, which contains the high altar. The abbey holds the 13th-century Westminster Retable, which is thought to be the altarpiece from Henry III's 13th-century church, in its collections. The present high altar and screen were designed by George Gilbert Scott between 1867 and 1873, and contain sculptures of Moses, St. Peter, St. Paul and King David made by the sculptor H. H. Armistead, and a mosaic of the Last Supper by the designer J. R. Clayton and the mosaic-maker Antonio Salviati.

The south transept contains wall paintings, made c.1300, which Richard Jenkyns calls "the grandest of their time remaining in England". They depict the apostle Thomas viewing Christ's stigmata and St. Christopher carrying the Christ child, and were discovered in 1934 behind two monuments. 14th-century paintings were also discovered during cleaning in 1923 on the backs of the sedilia, or seats used by priests on either side of the high altar. On the south side, there are three figures: Edward the Confessor, the angel Gabriel and the Virgin Mary; and on the north side there are two kings, possibly Henry III and Edward I. They were walled off during the Commonwealth period by order of Parliament.

Over the Great West Door are ten statues of 20th-century Christian martyrs of various denominations, made by the abbey's craftsmen in 1998. Those commemorated are Maximilian Kolbe, Manche Masemola, Janani Luwum, Grand Duchess Elizabeth Feodorovna, Martin Luther King Jr., Óscar Romero, Dietrich Bonhoeffer, Esther John, Lucian Tapiedi, and Wang Zhiming.

From the chapter house is a doorway leading to the abbey's library, built as a dormitory for the monks and used as a library since the 16th century. The collection consists of around 16,000 volumes. Next to the library is the Muniment Room, where the abbey's store of historic archives is kept.

Cosmati pavement 

At the crossing, underneath Edward the Confessor's shrine and the main altar, is the Cosmati pavement, a 700-year-old tiled floor made of almost 80,000 pieces of coloured glass and stone set in Purbeck marble. As opposed to traditional mosaic work, the pieces are not cut to a uniform size, being instead made with a technique known as opus sectile ("cut work"). The floor is named after the Cosmati family in Rome who were known for such work. It was commissioned by Richard Ware, who travelled to Rome in 1258 when he became Abbot, and returned with stone and artists. The porphyry used was originally quarried as far away as Egypt, and was presumably brought to Italy during the days of the Roman Empire. When it was made, it was surrounded by an inscription in brass letters, since lost, written in Latin, giving the name of the artist as Odericus, probably referring to designer Pietro di Oderisio or his son. The inscription also predicts the end of the world 19,863 years after the creation of the world. The pavement is depicted in the 16th century painting The Ambassadors by Hans Holbein.

Stained glass 

The 13th century abbey's windows would have been filled with stained glass, but much of this was destroyed in the English Civil War and the Blitz and replaced with clear, plain glass. Since the 19th century, new stained glass has replaced clear, designed by artists such as Ninian Comper (on the north side of the nave), Hugh Easton and Alan Younger (in the Henry VII Chapel).

The north rose window was designed by James Thornhill and made by Joshua Price in 1722 and shows Christ, the apostles (not including Judas Iscariot), and the four Evangelists. In the centre is the Bible. The window was restored by J. L. Pearson in the 19th century, during which the figures of the feet were cut off. Thornhill also designed the great west window, which shows the Biblical figures of Abraham, Isaac and Jacob, with representatives of the twelve Tribes of Israel underneath.

In the Henry VII Chapel, the west window was designed by John Lawson and unveiled in 1995. It depicts coats of arms and cyphers of Westminster Abbey's benefactors, in particular John Templeton, whose coat of arms is depicted prominently in the lower panel. In the centre are shown the arms of Elizabeth II. The central east window is designed by Alan Younger and was unveiled in 2000. It is dedicated to the Virgin Mary. It depicts the Hale Bopp comet, which was passing over the artist's house at the time, as the star of Bethlehem. The donors of the window, Lord and Lady Harris of Peckham, are shown kneeling at the bottom.

In 2018, the artist David Hockney unveiled a new stained-glass window for the north transept, designed to celebrate the reign of Elizabeth II. It shows a countryside scene inspired by his native Yorkshire, with hawthorn blossoms and blue skies. Hockney used an iPad to design the window to replicate the backlight that comes through stained glass.

Burials and memorials 

Henry III rebuilt the abbey partly in honour of a royal saint, Edward the Confessor – whose relics were placed in a shrine in the sanctuary – and partly to serve as a burial place for himself and his family. He was interred near to the shrine, as were many of the Plantagenet kings of England, their wives and other relatives. From the death of Henry III in 1272 until the death of George II in 1760, most kings and queens were buried in the abbey. They include Edward the Confessor, Henry III, Edward I, Edward III, Richard II, Henry V, Edward V, Henry VII, Edward VI, Mary I, Mary Queen of Scots, Elizabeth I, James I, Charles II, Mary II, William III, Queen Anne, and George II. Elizabeth and Mary, Queen of Scots were the last monarchs to be buried with full tomb effigies; monarchs buried after them are commemorated in the abbey with simple inscriptions. Most monarchs after George II have been buried either in St. George's Chapel, Windsor or at the Frogmore Royal Burial Ground to the east of Windsor Castle.

For much of the abbey's history, most of the people buried there besides monarchs were people with a connection to the church – either ordinary locals or the monks of the abbey itself, who were generally buried without surviving markers. Since the 18th century, it has become one of Britain's most significant honours to be buried or commemorated in the abbey. The practice of burying national figures in the abbey began under Oliver Cromwell with the burial of Admiral Robert Blake in 1657 (although he was subsequently reburied outside). The practice spread to include generals, admirals, politicians, doctors and scientists, and was much boosted by the lavish funeral and monument of Isaac Newton, who died in 1727.

In 1864, Arthur Penrhyn Stanley was appointed dean of the abbey, and was very influential in turning it into a "national church". He invited popular preachers to draw in large congregations, and attracted crowds by arranging for celebrities of the day to be buried in the abbey, such as writer Charles Dickens, explorer David Livingstone, and scientist Charles Darwin—even when those people had expressed wishes to be buried elsewhere.

Politicians buried in the abbey include Pitt the Elder, Charles James Fox, Pitt the Younger, William Gladstone, and Clement Attlee. A cluster of scientists surrounds the tomb of Isaac Newton, including Charles Darwin and Stephen Hawking. Actors include David Garrick, Henry Irving, and Laurence Olivier. Musicians tend to be buried in the north aisle of the nave, and include Muzio Clementi, Henry Purcell, and Ralph Vaughan Williams. George Frideric Handel is buried in Poets Corner.

During the early 20th century, it became increasingly common to bury cremated remains rather than coffins in the abbey. In 1905, the actor Sir Henry Irving was cremated and his ashes buried in Westminster Abbey, thereby becoming the first person to be cremated before interment at the abbey. The majority of modern interments are of cremated remains, but some burials still take place – Frances Challen, wife of Sebastian Charles, Canon of Westminster, was buried alongside her husband in the south choir aisle in 2014. Members of the Percy family have a family vault, the Northumberland Vault, in St Nicholas' Chapel within the abbey.

Poets' Corner 

The south transept of the church is nicknamed Poets' Corner because of its high concentration of burials and memorials to poets and writers. The first was Geoffrey Chaucer, buried around 1400, who was employed as master of the King's Works and had apartments in the abbey. Nearly 200 years later in 1599, a second poet, Edmund Spenser, who was local to the abbey, was buried nearby. However, the idea of a poets' corner did not fully crystallise until the 18th century, when memorials were established to writers buried elsewhere, such as William Shakespeare and John Milton. Since then, writers buried in Poets' Corner include John Dryden, Alfred, Lord Tennyson, Charles Dickens, and Rudyard Kipling. However, not all writers buried in the abbey are in the south transept: Ben Jonson is buried standing upright in the north aisle of the nave, and Aphra Behn in the cloisters.

The Unknown Warrior 

On the floor, just inside the Great West Door, in the centre of the nave, is the grave of The Unknown Warrior, an unidentified British soldier killed on a European battlefield during the First World War. Although many countries have adopted the tradition of a Tomb of the Unknown Soldier or Warrior, the one in Westminster Abbey was the first, and came about as a response to the unprecedented death rate of the war. The idea came from an army chaplain called David Railton, who first suggested the idea in 1920. The funeral was held on the second anniversary of the end of the war,  11 November 1920. The Unknown Warrior lay in state for a week afterwards, and an estimated 1.25 million people queued to see him in that time. This grave is the only one in the abbey on which it is forbidden to walk, and every visit by a foreign head of state begins with a visit to the tomb.

Royal occasions 
The abbey has strong connections with the royal family, being patronised by various monarchs; as the location for coronations, royal weddings and funerals; and where several monarchs have attended services. In addition, one monarch was born and one died at Westminster Abbey. In 1413, Henry IV collapsed while praying at the shrine of Edward the Confessor. He was moved into the Jerusalem Chamber and died shortly afterwards. Between 1470 and 1471, because of fallout from the Wars of the Roses, Elizabeth Woodville, the wife of Edward IV, took sanctuary at Westminster Abbey while her husband was deposed, and gave birth to the future Edward V in the abbot's house.

The first jubilee celebration held at the abbey was for Queen Victoria's Golden Jubilee in 1887. Rather than wearing the full regalia that she had worn at her coronation, instead she wore her ordinary black mourning clothes topped with the insignia of the Order of the Garter and a miniature crown. She sat in the Coronation Chair, which was given a coat of dark varnish for the occasion which afterwards had to be painstakingly removed, making her the only monarch to have sat in the chair twice. Queen Elizabeth II and her husband, Prince Philip, also marked their silver, gold, and diamond wedding anniversaries with services at the abbey,  and regularly attended annual observances there for Commonwealth Day.

The monarch participates in the Office of the Royal Maundy on Maundy Thursday each year, during which selected elderly people receive alms consisting of coins, given out to as many people of each sex as the monarch has years of their life. Since 1952, the service moved to various churches around the country, returning to the abbey every 10 years.

Coronations 

Since the coronation in 1066 of William the Conqueror, a total of 39 English and British monarchs (not counting Edward V, Lady Jane Grey, and Edward VIII, who were never crowned) have been crowned in Westminster Abbey. In 1216, Henry III could not be crowned in the abbey, as London was captured by hostile forces at the time. He was crowned in Gloucester Cathedral and later had a second coronation at Westminster Abbey in 1220. When he had the abbey rebuilt in the 13th century, it was designed with future coronations in mind, with long transepts in order to accommodate many guests. On 11 October 2022, it was announced that the coronation of King Charles III would also take place at the abbey on 6 May 2023.

The area of the church used is the crossing, known in the abbey as the theatre because of its particular suitability for such grand events. Rather than being filled with immovable pews as in many similar churches, the space in the crossing is clear, allowing for temporary seating to be installed in the transepts.

The Coronation Chair, the throne on which English and British sovereigns have been seated at the moment of crowning, is housed within the abbey in St. George's Chapel near the west door, and has been used at coronations since the 14th century. From 1301 to 1996 (except for a short time in 1950 when the stone was temporarily stolen by Scottish nationalists), the chair also housed the Stone of Scone upon which the kings of Scots were crowned. Although it has been kept in Scotland, at Edinburgh Castle, since 1996, it is intended that the stone will be returned temporarily to the Coronation Chair for use during future coronation ceremonies. In the 18th and 19th centuries, the chair was freely accessible to the public, who were able to sit in it, and even carve initials into the woodwork.

Much of the order of service still derives from an illuminated manuscript called the Liber Regalis, made in 1377 for the coronation of Richard II and held in the abbey's collections.

Prior to the 17th century, when a king married after his coronation, he would hold a separate coronation for his new queen. The last of these to take place in the abbey was the coronation of Anne Boleyn in 1533, after her marriage to Henry VIII. There have been a total of 15 separate coronations for queen consorts in the abbey. A coronation for Henry VIII's third wife, Jane Seymour, was planned, but she died before it took place, and no coronations were planned for his subsequent wives. Mary I's husband, Philip of Spain, was not given a separate coronation for fear that he would attempt to rule alone after Mary's death. Since then, there have been few opportunities for a second coronation, as monarchs have generally come to the throne already married. In 1170, Henry II held a separate coronation at Westminster Abbey for his son, known as Henry the Young King, while he, Henry II, was still alive, in an attempt to secure the succession. However, the Young King died before his father, so never took the throne.

Many new monarchs have presented the abbey with a gift of fine fabric at their coronation. Some have given as little as a symbolic scrap, but some give more: George V donated new altar cloths, and George VI and Elizabeth II each gave enough to make new vestments for the abbey clergy.

Royal weddings

Prior to the 20th century, royal weddings at the abbey were relatively rare, with royals often being married in a Chapel Royal or at Windsor Castle instead. This changed with the 1922 wedding of Princess Mary at the abbey, which successfully started a trend. In 1923, Lady Elizabeth Bowes-Lyon became the first royal bride to leave her bouquet on the Grave of the Unknown Warrior, a practice continued by many royal brides since.

Royal weddings have included:

Royal funerals 
Many royal funerals have taken place at the abbey, dating back to that of Edward the Confessor in 1066. Until the 18th century, many English and British monarchs were buried here, although since the 19th century, the custom has been to have the funeral at Westminster Abbey and then have the burial elsewhere.

In 1290, Eleanor of Castile, queen of Edward I, died in Nottinghamshire. Over the course of several days, the body was brought to Westminster Abbey, and at each of the places the cortège rested, an Eleanor Cross was erected in memory. The most famous of these is Charing Cross, the last stop before the funeral. Eleanor of Castile is buried in the abbey alongside her husband.

In 1483, the child king Edward V and his brother, Richard (known collectively as the Princes in the Tower), disappeared while preparing for Edward's coronation at the Tower of London. Although it is not known for sure what happened to the boys, historians have suspected their uncle, who became Richard III, of having them murdered. In 1674, the remains of two children were discovered at the Tower, and were buried in Westminster Abbey with royal honours. In 1933, the bones were studied by an anatomist who suggested that they might indeed be the remains of the two princes.

Although not a royal funeral, the burial of Lord Protector Oliver Cromwell took place at the abbey in 1658 with full honours normally only given to monarchs. On top of the coffin lay an effigy of Cromwell complete with crown.

On 6 September 1997 the formal, though not state funeral of Diana, Princess of Wales, was held at the abbey. It was a royal ceremonial funeral including royal pageantry and Anglican funeral liturgy. In the run-up to the funeral, the railings of the abbey were swamped with flowers and tributes, and the event was more widely witnessed than any previous occasion in the abbey's history, with 2 billion television viewers worldwide. A second public service was held on the following Sunday. The burial occurred privately on 6 September on the grounds of her family estate, Althorp, on a private island.

On 19 September 2022, the state funeral of Elizabeth II took place at the abbey before her burial at St. George's Chapel, Windsor.

Dean and Chapter

Westminster Abbey is a collegiate church governed by the Dean and Chapter of Westminster, as established by royal charter of Elizabeth I dated 21 May 1560, which created it as the Collegiate Church of St. Peter Westminster, a royal peculiar under the personal jurisdiction of the sovereign. The members of the Chapter are the dean and four canons residentiary; they are assisted by the Receiver General and Chapter Clerk. One of the canons is also Rector of St. Margaret's Church, Westminster, and often also holds the post of Chaplain to the Speaker of the House of Commons. In addition to the dean and canons, there are at present three full-time minor canons: the precentor, the sacrist and the chaplain. A series of priests vicar assist the minor canons.

King's Almsmen
An establishment of six King's (or Queen's) Almsmen and women is supported by the abbey; they are appointed by royal warrant on the recommendation of the dean and the Home Secretary, attend Matins and Evensong on Sundays and do such duties as may be requested (in return for which they receive a small stipend); when on duty they wear a distinctive red gown with a crowned rose badge on the left shoulder. From the late 18th until the late 20th century the almsmen were usually ex-servicemen, but today they are mostly retired employees of the abbey. Historically, the King's Almsmen and women were retired Crown servants residing in the Royal Almshouse at Westminster, which had been established by Henry VII in connection with his building of the new Lady Chapel, to support the priests of his chantry by offering daily prayer. The Royal Almshouse survived the Dissolution of the Monasteries, but was demolished for road-widening in 1779.

Schools

Westminster School is located in the precincts of the abbey. Teaching certainly took place from the fourteenth century, alongside the monks of the abbey, but the school regards its founder as Elizabeth I, who dissolved the monastery for the final time and provided for the establishment of the school alongside a dean of the abbey, canons, and assistant clergy and lay officers. The schoolboys themselves have added to the history of the abbey, often with their rambunctiousness: Westminster boys have defaced the Coronation Chair, disrupted services, and once interrupted a consecration of four bishops by starting a bare-knuckle fight in the cloisters. One schoolboy carved upon the Coronation Chair that he had slept in it overnight, making him probably its longest inhabitant. In 1868, Westminster School became independent of the abbey Dean and Chapter, although the two institutions are still closely connected.

Separately, Westminster Abbey Choir School is also located within the abbey grounds and exclusively educates the choirboys who sing for abbey services.

Music

Westminster Abbey has its own choir which has sung at daily services since the 14th century. The abbey choir consists of 12 professional adults and up to thirty boy choristers who attend Westminster Abbey Choir School.

Organ

The organ was built by Harrison & Harrison in 1937, then with four manuals and 84 speaking stops, and was used for the first time at the coronation of George VI. Some pipework from the previous Hill organ of 1848 was revoiced and incorporated in the new scheme. The two organ cases, designed and built in the late 19th century by J. L. Pearson, were reinstated and coloured in 1959.

In 1982 and 1987, Harrison & Harrison enlarged the organ under the direction of the abbey organist Simon Preston to include an additional Lower Choir Organ and a Bombarde Organ. The full instrument has five manuals and 109 speaking stops. In 2006, the console of the organ was refurbished by Harrison & Harrison, and space was prepared for two additional 16 ft stops on the Lower Choir Organ and the Bombarde Organ.

Andrew Nethsingha was announced as Organist and Master of the choristers in December 2022, taking up the post in 2023.

Bells 
The bells at the abbey were installed in the north-west tower in 1971. The ring is made up of ten bells, hung for change ringing, cast in 1971 by the Whitechapel Bell Foundry, tuned to the notes: F#, E, D, C#, B, A, G, F#, E and D. The Tenor bell in D (588.5 Hz) has a weight of 30 cwt, 1 qtr, 15 lb (3403 lb or 1544 kg).

In addition there are two service bells cast by Robert Mot in 1585 and 1598, a Sanctus bell cast in 1738 by Richard Phelps and Thomas Lester, and two unused bells—one cast about 1320, and a second cast in 1742, by Thomas Lester. The two service bells and the 1320 bell, along with a fourth small silver "dish bell", kept in the refectory, have been noted as being of historical importance by the Church Buildings Council of the Church of England.

Order of the Bath 

The Most Honourable Order of the Bath is a British order of chivalry whose spiritual home is the Henry VII Chapel in Westminster Abbey. It was founded by George I on 18 May 1725 and devised by Robert Walpole and John Anstis. The name derives from the elaborate medieval ceremony for appointing a knight, which involved bathing (as a symbol of purification) as one of its elements.

The Order consists of the monarch, the Great Master, and three Classes of members:
 Knight Grand Cross (GCB) or Dame Grand Cross (GCB)
 Knight Commander (KCB) or Dame Commander (DCB)
 Companion (CB) 

The Order of the Bath is the fourth-most senior of the British Orders of Chivalry, after The Most Noble Order of the Garter, The Most Ancient and Most Noble Order of the Thistle, and The Most Illustrious Order of St Patrick (dormant).

Members are given stalls, complete with their banner, crest and stallplate, at installation ceremonies at the abbey every four years. The ceremonies were stopped in 1847 and recommenced during the reign of George V. There are far many more members than stalls, and so some members wait many years for their installation.

The Queen's Diamond Jubilee Galleries
The Westminster Abbey Museum was located in the 11th-century vaulted undercroft beneath the former monks' dormitory. This was one of the oldest areas of the abbey, dating back almost to the foundation of the church by Edward the Confessor in 1065. This space had been used as a museum since 1908 but was closed to the public in June 2018, when it was replaced as a museum by the Queen's Diamond Jubilee Galleries, high up in the abbey's triforium.

The exhibits include a set of life-size effigies of English and British monarchs and their consorts, originally made to lie on the coffin in the funeral procession or to be displayed over the tomb. The effigies date from the 14th to the 18th century, and some even include original clothes.

On display in the galleries is a portrait of the Queen called The Coronation Theatre, Westminster Abbey: A Portrait of Her Majesty Queen Elizabeth II, painted by the artist Ralph Heimans, depicting the monarch standing on the Cosmati pavement of Westminster Abbey, where she was crowned in 1953. Other exhibits include a model of an unbuilt tower, designed by architect Christopher Wren; a paper model of the abbey showing Queen Victoria's 1837 coronation; and the wedding licence of Prince William and Catherine Middleton, who were married in the abbey in 2011.

In popular culture 

The abbey is mentioned in the play Henry VIII written by William Shakespeare and John Fletcher, when a gentleman describes the scene of Anne Boleyn's coronation.

The abbey has been mentioned in poetry as early as 1598, in a sonnet by Thomas Bastard, which begins "When I behold, with deep astonishment/ To famous Westminster how there restort/ Living in brass or stony monument/ The princes and the worthies of all sort". Poetry about the abbey has also been written by Francis Beaumont and John Betjeman.

The abbey has appeared in paintings by artists such as Canaletto, Wenceslaus Hollar, William Bruce Ellis Ranken, and J. M. W. Turner.

Key scenes in the book and film The Da Vinci Code take place in Westminster Abbey. In 2005, the abbey refused filming permission to the crew of the film, calling the book "theologically unsound". Instead, the film uses Lincoln Cathedral as a stand-in for the abbey. The abbey issued a factsheet to their staff to allow them to answer questions from fans that debunked several claims made in the book. In 2022, it was announced that the abbey had given rare permission for filming inside the church to the film Mission: Impossible- Dead Reckoning Part Two.

See also

 Archdeacon of Westminster
 Dean of Westminster
 List of churches in London
 The Abbey (a three-part BBC TV documentary written and hosted by playwright Alan Bennett)

Notes and references

Notes

References

External links

 
 Westminster Abbey on Twitter
 The Choir of Westminster Abbey on Twitter

 
Churches completed in 1745
Christian monasteries established in the 10th century
Abbey
Collegiate churches in England
Coronation church buildings
English Gothic architecture in Greater London
Gothic architecture in England
Grade I listed churches in the City of Westminster
Nicholas Hawksmoor buildings
Monasteries in London
Abbey
London, Westminster Abbey|Abbey
Abbey
World Heritage Sites in London
13th-century architecture in the United Kingdom
Edward Blore buildings
Burial sites of the House of Tudor
Burial sites of the House of Stuart
Former cathedrals in London
1st-millennium establishments in England
Burial sites of the House of Hanover
Monasteries dissolved under the English Reformation